Alumel is an alloy consisting of approximately 95% nickel, 2% aluminium, 2% manganese, and 1% silicon. This magnetic alloy is used to make the negative conductors of ANSI Type K (chromel-alumel) thermocouples and thermocouple extension wire. Alumel is a registered trademark of Concept Alloys, Inc.

References

External links
  Application guide and material properties of thermocouple wires (via Omega Engineering, Inc).

Nickel alloys
Aluminium alloys